"Period of Adjustment" was the 179th episode of the M*A*S*H television series, and the sixth episode of season eight. The episode aired on October 22, 1979.

Synopsis

Radar's departure is revisited in events surrounding B.J. and Klinger. Klinger is still unable to perform the duty of company clerk as efficiently as Radar did and is receiving backlash for it from Colonel Potter, who questions if Klinger should admit the job is too much for him, declaring "We can't all be Radars", Margaret, and Charles, both of whom remark on how much better Radar was. Hawkeye, B.J, and Father Mulcahy are the only ones being somewhat supportive of Klinger's efforts.

Meanwhile, B.J. receives a letter from his wife Peg, claiming that she and their daughter Erin met Radar in San Francisco, and Erin mistakenly called Radar "Daddy". B.J. grows increasingly troubled anytime anyone mentions Radar's name, and falls into a deep depression. Agonizing over missing out on his daughter's childhood, B.J. decides to drink his way out of the Army. But when confronted by Hawkeye, who insists that it won't work. B.J. destroys their still and punches Hawkeye in the face as he runs out of the Swamp.  He eventually meets up with Klinger, who is having similar frustrations with his own issues, and the two go on a collective bender that gets them thrown out of Rosie's Bar, and culminates in them trashing Col. Potter's office.

Eventually, Potter is convinced to ease off Klinger after a discussion with Father Mulcahy, who points out that Radar had similar, if not worse, struggles during his early days as company clerk, and it took patience and a guiding hand from Lt. Col. Blake to help him get settled into the job; Potter then catches up with Kinger and recalls how the 4077th was initially less than thrilled about Potter taking over command of the unit, after Lt. Col. Blake's death, but eventually they grew to respect him for who he was. He apologizes to Klinger for forgetting what it's like to be replacing a previously well-liked figure, and for not giving Klinger the time or space he needs to make the job his own, rather than Radar's, and also offers his help should Klinger need it.

Meanwhile, Hawkeye (wearing his combat helmet just in case) talks to B.J., who apologizes for trashing the still and hitting "the best friend I ever had". He admits that the still was a symbol of Trapper who helped build it, and like Radar, is now home with his family, and he felt jealousy towards both of them. Still upset over the fact that the first person Erin ever called "Daddy" wasn't him, and that he would never get back the time he's missing being away from his daughter, even if he were to go home the next day, B.J. collapses into tears in Hawkeye's arms.  A few days later, Hawkeye and B.J., with help from Klinger in finding the necessary parts, rebuild the still and, in celebration, give Klinger the first "belt", but Klinger recoils from the taste.

External links
 

M*A*S*H (season 8) episodes
1979 American television episodes